Struggle is a 2007 Chinese television series directed by Zhao Baogang, based on the award-winning novel of the same name by Shi Kang. It is part of the 'Youth' trilogy directed by Zhao, which includes  My Youthfulness (2009) and Beijing Youth (2012).

Synopsis 
About the aspirations and struggles of China's Post-80's generation after graduation from college.

Cast
Tong Dawei as Lu Tao
Ma Yili as Xia Lin
Wen Zhang as Xiang Nan
Li Xiaolu as Yang Xiaoyun
Wang Luodan as Mi Cai
Zhu Yuchen as Hua Zi 
Ivy Chen as Fang Lingshan

Soundtrack

Reception 
Struggle was well received by its post-80's generation audiences. Many rated the series highly, calling it "a milestone in Chinese TV productions" for the innovative break-away from the traditional style of Chinese television drama. The series' recreation of realistic youth life was also praised by its audience, most of which calling it the first Chinese television drama to successfully convey the feelings, attitudes, ways of thinking, colloquial language of the generation.

However, many Chinese netizens have complained that some scenes in the series are unrealistic, particularly which the scene which the 20-year-old protagonist owns and drives an Audi.

References

External links 
Struggle Official Website

Television shows set in China
2007 Chinese television series debuts
Mandarin-language television shows
Chinese drama television series
Chinese romance television series
Television shows based on Chinese novels